The 2015 Vuelta a Asturias was the 58th edition of the Vuelta a Asturias cycling stage race. It was the first edition since 2013, as the race did not take place in 2014 due to financial issues. The race was rated as a 2.1 event as part of the 2015 UCI Europe Tour. The race included two stages: it started on 2 May with a stage from Oviedo to Pola de Lena and finished on 3 May with a stage that started in Soto de Ribera and then finished back in Oviedo. The defending champion was Amets Txurruka.

The race was won by Igor Antón, who took a solo victory on the first stage then finished in the lead group on the second stage to secure victory by 12 seconds.

Schedule 

The race included two road stages on consecutive days.

Stages

Stage 1 
2 May 2015 – Oviedo to Pola de Lena,

Stage 2 
3 May 2015 – Ribera de Arriba to Oviedo,

Classification leadership table 

The race included four principal classifications, the leaders of which wore jerseys. The leader in the general classification wore a blue jersey; the leader in the points classification wore an orange jersey; the leader in the mountains classification wore a white jersey and the leader of the intermediate sprints classification wore a black and white jersey.

References

External links 
 

Vuelta Asturias
Asturias, Vuelta a
Asturias, Vuelta a